John Clark Howat (January 22, 1918 – October 30, 2009) was an American film and television actor.

Life and career 
Howat was born in Calaveras County, California. He began his career in 1947, appearing in the Broadway play The Wanhope Building, playing the roles of the "Interviewer" and "Pilot".

Howat began his film career in July 1947, playing the role of the "Patron in Macy's Lunchroom" in the film Miracle on 34th Street. His early film career was mostly uncredited and co-starring roles.

His later credits include The Doctor and the Girl, Customs Agent, Airport, My Blue Heaven and California Passage, among others.

He began appearing on television in 1952, appearing in Beulah, playing the role of "Pete Bradley". In 1956, Howat played the main role of "Dr. Jack (John) Petrie" in the short-lived sitcom television series The Adventures of Dr. Fu Manchu. He also appeared in Dragnet, Highway Patrol, Alfred Hitchcock Presents, Navy Log, Tales of Wells Fargo, Bat Masterson and The Millionaire. He also wrote the episode "Walk a Crooked Line" for the crime drama television series The Detectives, in 1962.

Howat also starred or co-starred in other films: Billy Jack, playing the role of "Sheriff Cole", The Hitch-Hiker, playing the role of the "Government Agent", The Giant Claw, playing the role of "Maj. Bergen" and The High Powered Rifle, playing the role of "George Merkle".

In 1985, Howat retired, last appearing in the television series T.J. Hooker.

Death 
Howat died in October 2009 in Arroyo Grande, California, at the age of 91.

Filmography

Film

Television

References

External links 

Rotten Tomatoes profile

1918 births
2009 deaths
People from Calaveras County, California
Male actors from California
American male film actors
American male television actors
20th-century American male actors